Festival of the Dreaming is an Indigenous cultural festival in Australia. Festival of the Dreaming was first held in 1997.

References

Australian Aboriginal art